Eta Volantis, Latinized from η Volantis, is a single star in the southern constellation of Volans. It has an apparent visual magnitude of 5.28, which is bright enough to be seen with the naked eye as a dim, white-hued star. Based upon parallax measurements, it is approximately 387 light years from the Sun.

This is an A-type star with a stellar classification of A0/1 IV/V, displaying blended spectrum that shows aspects of a main sequence star and a subgiant. Stellar evolution models from Zorec and Royer (2012) place it near the main sequence turnoff, having completed 90.7% of its time on the main sequence. The star is estimated to be 347 million years old and is spinning rapidly with a projected rotational velocity of 214 km/s. It has 2.73 times the mass of the Sun and 3.43 times the Sun's radius.

Eta Volantis has two 12th magnitude optical companions at angular separations of 26.8 and  	48.1 arcseconds.

References

A-type main-sequence stars
A-type subgiants

Volans (constellation)
Volantis, Eta
Durchmusterung objects
071576
041003
3334